The Northern constituency (No.213) is a Russian legislative constituency in Saint Petersburg. It is based in northern part of the city.

Members elected

Election results

1993

|-
! colspan=2 style="background-color:#E9E9E9;text-align:left;vertical-align:top;" |Candidate
! style="background-color:#E9E9E9;text-align:left;vertical-align:top;" |Party
! style="background-color:#E9E9E9;text-align:right;" |Votes
! style="background-color:#E9E9E9;text-align:right;" |%
|-
|style="background-color:"|
|align=left|Mikhail Kiselyov
|align=left|Independent
|
|8.02%
|-
| colspan="5" style="background-color:#E9E9E9;"|
|- style="font-weight:bold"
| colspan="3" style="text-align:left;" | Total
| 
| 100%
|-
| colspan="5" style="background-color:#E9E9E9;"|
|- style="font-weight:bold"
| colspan="4" |Source:
|
|}

1995

|-
! colspan=2 style="background-color:#E9E9E9;text-align:left;vertical-align:top;" |Candidate
! style="background-color:#E9E9E9;text-align:left;vertical-align:top;" |Party
! style="background-color:#E9E9E9;text-align:right;" |Votes
! style="background-color:#E9E9E9;text-align:right;" |%
|-
|style="background-color:"|
|align=left|Galina Starovoytova
|align=left|Independent
|
|13.12%
|-
|style="background-color:#1A1A1A"|
|align=left|Viktor Talanov
|align=left|Stanislav Govorukhin Bloc
|
|10.34%
|-
|style="background-color:"|
|align=left|Viktor Volodkin
|align=left|Yabloko
|
|9.92%
|-
|style="background-color:#3A46CE"|
|align=left|Yury Derevyanko
|align=left|Democratic Choice of Russia – United Democrats
|
|9.72%
|-
|style="background-color:#D50000"|
|align=left|Yury Terentyev
|align=left|Communists and Working Russia - for the Soviet Union
|
|8.94%
|-
|style="background-color:"|
|align=left|Igor Ignatyev
|align=left|Independent
|
|8.43%
|-
|style="background-color:"|
|align=left|Valery Selivanov
|align=left|Independent
|
|5.93%
|-
|style="background-color:"|
|align=left|Yury Yefimov
|align=left|Independent
|
|3.97%
|-
|style="background-color:"|
|align=left|Lev Konstantinov·
|align=left|Independent
|
|3.73%
|-
|style="background-color:"|
|align=left|Viktor Kirilenko
|align=left|Independent
|
|1.98%
|-
|style="background-color:"|
|align=left|Sergey Bodrov
|align=left|Liberal Democratic Party
|
|1.78%
|-
|style="background-color:"|
|align=left|Boris Vasilyev
|align=left|Independent
|
|1.75%
|-
|style="background-color:"|
|align=left|Viktor Kovalev
|align=left|Independent
|
|1.42%
|-
|style="background-color:#FE4801"|
|align=left|Viktor Drozdov
|align=left|Pamfilova–Gurov–Lysenko
|
|1.25%
|-
|style="background-color:"|
|align=left|Andrey Devyatkin
|align=left|Independent
|
|1.24%
|-
|style="background-color:#1C1A0D"|
|align=left|Dmitry Astakhov
|align=left|Forward, Russia!
|
|1.22%
|-
|style="background-color:"|
|align=left|Aleksandr Diomidovsky
|align=left|Independent
|
|0.90%
|-
|style="background-color:#00A200"|
|align=left|Sergey Volodenkov
|align=left|Transformation of the Fatherland
|
|0.52%
|-
|style="background-color:"|
|align=left|Boris Shestopalov
|align=left|Independent
|
|0.51%
|-
|style="background-color:"|
|align=left|Viktor Makarov
|align=left|Independent
|
|0.44%
|-
|style="background-color:"|
|align=left|Valery Yurchenko
|align=left|Union of Patriots
|
|0.34%
|-
|style="background-color:"|
|align=left|Nikolay Fuga
|align=left|Independent
|
|0.31%
|-
|style="background-color:"|
|align=left|Valery Khotyanovich
|align=left|Independent
|
|0.25%
|-
|style="background-color:#019CDC"|
|align=left|Sergey Rudasev
|align=left|Party of Russian Unity and Accord
|
|0.21%
|-
|style="background-color:#000000"|
|colspan=2 |against all
|
|9.36%
|-
| colspan="5" style="background-color:#E9E9E9;"|
|- style="font-weight:bold"
| colspan="3" style="text-align:left;" | Total
| 
| 100%
|-
| colspan="5" style="background-color:#E9E9E9;"|
|- style="font-weight:bold"
| colspan="4" |Source:
|
|}

1999

|-
! colspan=2 style="background-color:#E9E9E9;text-align:left;vertical-align:top;" |Candidate
! style="background-color:#E9E9E9;text-align:left;vertical-align:top;" |Party
! style="background-color:#E9E9E9;text-align:right;" |Votes
! style="background-color:#E9E9E9;text-align:right;" |%
|-
|style="background-color:"|
|align=left|Sergey Stepashin
|align=left|Yabloko
|
|49.41%
|-
|style="background-color:"|
|align=left|Aleksey Vorontsov
|align=left|Independent
|
|15.13%
|-
|style="background-color:#3B9EDF"|
|align=left|Anna Chesnokova
|align=left|Fatherland – All Russia
|
|9.83%
|-
|style="background-color:"|
|align=left|Nikolay Bondarik
|align=left|Independent
|
|6.08%
|-
|style="background-color:"|
|align=left|Yakov Nakatis
|align=left|Our Home – Russia
|
|1.95%
|-
|style="background-color:#084284"|
|align=left|Valery Abakumov
|align=left|Spiritual Heritage
|
|1.16%
|-
|style="background-color:"|
|align=left|Andrey Devyatkin
|align=left|Independent
|
|0.79%
|-
|style="background-color:"|
|align=left|Eduard Sergeyev
|align=left|Independent
|
|0.64%
|-
|style="background-color:"|
|align=left|Valery Fedosenko
|align=left|Independent
|
|0.57%
|-
|style="background-color:"|
|align=left|Lev Nechipurenko
|align=left|Independent
|
|0.29%
|-
|style="background-color:#000000"|
|colspan=2 |against all
|
|13.24%
|-
| colspan="5" style="background-color:#E9E9E9;"|
|- style="font-weight:bold"
| colspan="3" style="text-align:left;" | Total
| 
| 100%
|-
| colspan="5" style="background-color:#E9E9E9;"|
|- style="font-weight:bold"
| colspan="4" |Source:
|
|}

2000
The results of the by-election were annulled due to low turnout (18.71%).

|-
! colspan=2 style="background-color:#E9E9E9;text-align:left;vertical-align:top;" |Candidate
! style="background-color:#E9E9E9;text-align:left;vertical-align:top;" |Party
! style="background-color:#E9E9E9;text-align:right;" |Votes
! style="background-color:#E9E9E9;text-align:right;" |%
|-
|style="background-color:"|
|align=left|Yury Savelyev
|align=left|Independent
|
|36.79%
|-
|style="background-color:#14589F"|
|align=left|Natalya Petukhova
|align=left|Development of Enterprise
|
|26.13%
|-
|style="background-color:"|
|align=left|Anatoly Golov
|align=left|Independent
|
|16.95%
|-
|style="background-color:"|
|align=left|Yury Shutov
|align=left|Independent
|
|5.97%
|-
|style="background-color:"|
|align=left|Sergey Andreyev
|align=left|Independent
|
|4.21%
|-
|style="background-color:"|
|align=left|Ruslan Linkov
|align=left|Independent
|
|3.06%
|-
|style="background-color:"|
|align=left|Anna Chesnokova
|align=left|Independent
|
|1.21%
|-
|style="background-color:"|
|align=left|Nikolay Bondarik
|align=left|Independent
|
|0.47%
|-
|style="background-color:"|
|align=left|Vyacheslav Marychev
|align=left|Independent
|
|0.38%
|-
|style="background-color:"|
|align=left|Valery Fedosenko
|align=left|Independent
|
|0.27%
|-
|style="background-color:"|
|align=left|Mikhail Zhivilo
|align=left|Independent
|
|0.06%
|-
|style="background-color:"|
|align=left|Yury Zhivilo
|align=left|Independent
|
|0.04%
|-
|style="background-color:#000000"|
|colspan=2 |against all
|
|3.94%
|-
| colspan="5" style="background-color:#E9E9E9;"|
|- style="font-weight:bold"
| colspan="3" style="text-align:left;" | Total
| 
| 100%
|-
| colspan="5" style="background-color:#E9E9E9;"|
|- style="font-weight:bold"
| colspan="4" |Source:
|
|}

2001
The results of the by-election were annulled due to low turnout (22.49%).

|-
! colspan=2 style="background-color:#E9E9E9;text-align:left;vertical-align:top;" |Candidate
! style="background-color:#E9E9E9;text-align:left;vertical-align:top;" |Party
! style="background-color:#E9E9E9;text-align:right;" |Votes
! style="background-color:#E9E9E9;text-align:right;" |%
|-
|style="background-color:"|
|align=left|Yury Savelyev
|align=left|Independent
|
|45.52%
|-
|style="background-color:#14589F"|
|align=left|Natalya Petukhova
|align=left|Development of Enterprise
|
|25.34%
|-
|style="background-color:"|
|align=left|Yury Solonin
|align=left|Independent
|
|21.67%
|-
|style="background-color:"|
|align=left|Yevgeny Faleyev
|align=left|Independent
|
|0.67%
|-
|style="background-color:"|
|align=left|Vladimir Dolgov
|align=left|Independent
|
|0.58%
|-
|style="background-color:"|
|align=left|Aleksandr Bakayev
|align=left|Independent
|
|0.53%
|-
|style="background-color:"|
|align=left|Vardkes Khachaturov
|align=left|Independent
|
|0.14%
|-
|style="background-color:#000000"|
|colspan=2 |against all
|
|4.92%
|-
| colspan="5" style="background-color:#E9E9E9;"|
|- style="font-weight:bold"
| colspan="3" style="text-align:left;" | Total
| 
| 100%
|-
| colspan="5" style="background-color:#E9E9E9;"|
|- style="font-weight:bold"
| colspan="4" |Source:
|
|}

2003

|-
! colspan=2 style="background-color:#E9E9E9;text-align:left;vertical-align:top;" |Candidate
! style="background-color:#E9E9E9;text-align:left;vertical-align:top;" |Party
! style="background-color:#E9E9E9;text-align:right;" |Votes
! style="background-color:#E9E9E9;text-align:right;" |%
|-
|style="background-color:#00A1FF"|
|align=left|Gennady Seleznyov
|align=left|Party of Russia's Rebirth-Russian Party of Life
|
|46.93%
|-
|style="background-color:#1042A5"|
|align=left|Irina Khakamada
|align=left|Union of Right Forces
|
|21.11%
|-
|style="background-color:"|
|align=left|Yelena Tabakova
|align=left|Independent
|
|7.25%
|-
|style="background-color:"|
|align=left|Aleksandr Krauze
|align=left|Communist Party
|
|5.82%
|-
|style="background-color:"|
|align=left|Yelena Babich
|align=left|Liberal Democratic Party
|
|3.10%
|-
|style="background-color:"|
|align=left|Sergey Sidorin
|align=left|Independent
|
|1.99%
|-
|style="background-color:"|
|align=left|Viktor Govyadovsky
|align=left|Independent
|
|1.43%
|-
|style="background-color:#000000"|
|colspan=2 |against all
|
|11.37%
|-
| colspan="5" style="background-color:#E9E9E9;"|
|- style="font-weight:bold"
| colspan="3" style="text-align:left;" | Total
| 
| 100%
|-
| colspan="5" style="background-color:#E9E9E9;"|
|- style="font-weight:bold"
| colspan="4" |Source:
|
|}

2016

|-
! colspan=2 style="background-color:#E9E9E9;text-align:left;vertical-align:top;" |Candidate
! style="background-color:#E9E9E9;text-align:leftt;vertical-align:top;" |Party
! style="background-color:#E9E9E9;text-align:right;" |Votes
! style="background-color:#E9E9E9;text-align:right;" |%
|-
|style="background-color: " |
|align=left|Yevgeny Marchenko
|align=left|United Russia
|
|36.54%
|-
|style="background-color:"|
|align=left|Sergey Panteleyev
|align=left|Communist Party
|
|10.43%
|-
|style="background:"| 
|align=left|Georgy Glagovsky
|align=left|Yabloko
|
|10.17%
|-
|style="background-color:"|
|align=left|Natalya Greys
|align=left|A Just Russia
|
|9.33%
|-
|style="background-color:"|
|align=left|Oleg Kapitanov
|align=left|Liberal Democratic Party
|
|9.05%
|-
|style="background:"| 
|align=left|Natalya Petukhova
|align=left|Party of Growth
|
|8.61%
|-
|style="background:"| 
|align=left|Natalya Gryaznevich
|align=left|People's Freedom Party
|
|3.80%
|-
|style="background-color:"|
|align=left|Andrey Kochergin
|align=left|Rodina
|
|3.30%
|-
|style="background:"| 
|align=left|Aleksandr Sakharov
|align=left|Communists of Russia
|
|2.46%
|-
|style="background:#00A650"| 
|align=left|Konstantin Bulgakov
|align=left|Civilian Power
|
|1.09%
|-
|style="background:"| 
|align=left|Aleksandr Fomishin
|align=left|Civic Platform
|
|0.61%
|-
|style="background:"| 
|align=left|Igor Kuznik
|align=left|Patriots of Russia
|
|0.58%
|-
| colspan="5" style="background-color:#E9E9E9;"|
|- style="font-weight:bold"
| colspan="3" style="text-align:left;" | Total
| 
| 100%
|-
| colspan="5" style="background-color:#E9E9E9;"|
|- style="font-weight:bold"
| colspan="4" |Source:
|
|}

2021

|-
! colspan=2 style="background-color:#E9E9E9;text-align:left;vertical-align:top;" |Candidate
! style="background-color:#E9E9E9;text-align:left;vertical-align:top;" |Party
! style="background-color:#E9E9E9;text-align:right;" |Votes
! style="background-color:#E9E9E9;text-align:right;" |%
|-
|style="background-color: " |
|align=left|Yevgeny Marchenko (incumbent)
|align=left|United Russia
|
|34.18%
|-
|style="background-color:"|
|align=left|Irina Ivanova
|align=left|Communist Party
|
|24.45%
|-
|style="background-color:"|
|align=left|Grigory Tochilnikov
|align=left|A Just Russia — For Truth
|
|10.02%
|-
|style="background-color:"|
|align=left|Nikolay Gromov
|align=left|Yabloko
|
|6.99%
|-
|style="background-color: "|
|align=left|Ilya Leshchev
|align=left|New People
|
|6.86%
|-
|style="background-color: "|
|align=left|Natalya Antyukh
|align=left|Party of Pensioners
|
|4.80%
|-
|style="background-color:"|
|align=left|Stanislav Ivanov
|align=left|Liberal Democratic Party
|
|3.73%
|-
|style="background-color:"|
|align=left|Anna Zvereva
|align=left|Green Alternative
|
|1.57%
|-
|style="background-color:"|
|align=left|Sergey Sibiryakov
|align=left|The Greens
|
|1.39%
|-
|style="background-color:"|
|align=left|Andrey Shpilenko
|align=left|Rodina
|
|1.26%
|-
|style="background:"| 
|align=left|Sergey Romanovsky
|align=left|Civic Platform
|
|0.91%
|-
| colspan="5" style="background-color:#E9E9E9;"|
|- style="font-weight:bold"
| colspan="3" style="text-align:left;" | Total
| 
| 100%
|-
| colspan="5" style="background-color:#E9E9E9;"|
|- style="font-weight:bold"
| colspan="4" |Source:
|
|}

Notes

References

Russian legislative constituencies
Politics of Saint Petersburg